HMS H44 was an H-class submarine of the Royal Navy. She was built by Armstrong Whitworth and launched on 17 February 1919. She served in the Second World War. She had a complement of twenty-two crew members. She was sold in 1944 and was broken up at Troon in February 1945.

Design

H44 was fitted with an anti-aircraft gun and four  torpedo tubes. Its torpedo tubes were fitted to the bows and the submarine was loaded with eight  torpedoes. It is a Holland 602 type submarine but was designed to meet Royal Navy specifications. Its complement was twenty-two crew members.

See also
 List of submarines of the Second World War

References

Bibliography
 

 

British H-class submarines
Ships built on the River Tyne
1919 ships
World War II submarines of the United Kingdom
Royal Navy ship names
Ships built by Armstrong Whitworth